Gira is a Lithuanian word for kvass.

Gira may also refer to:

Gira (bicycle rental), a bike rental scheme in Lisbon, Portugal
Gira (grape), another name for the Italian wine grape Girò
Pomba Gira, a deity of Umbanda and Quimbanda religions in Brazil

People
Camille Gira (born 1958), Luxembourgian politician
Liudas Gira (1894–1946), Lithuanian writer
Michael Gira (born 1954), American musician, author, and artist